Christmas in the Brothel is an oil-on-canvas painting by Norwegian painter Edvard Munch. The Expressionist painting was completed in 1903–04 and is housed at the Munch Museum in Oslo.

Background
The painting was done at a difficult time for Munch: a commission for a portrait in Hamburg (of a Senator Holthusen, the father in law of Munch's patron Max Linde) had come to naught because of disagreements. As a result, Munch suffered anxieties, which he attempted to manage with alcohol. A visit to a brothel in Lübeck is supposedly the background to Christmas in the Brothel, a "light yet melancholy" painting in which the working girls in a brothel have just finished decorating a Christmas tree. "Ironic, sentimentally unholy", the painting is interpreted as a commentary on both Linde's upper-class household (where Munch was staying at the time) and Munch's own "pietistic home background". Like other paintings of the period, it shows Munch's association with Fauvism. Prostitution was a favored topic of Munch's, and one particular room in a German brothel would later inspire an entire series of paintings, The Green Room.

References

1904 paintings
Paintings by Edvard Munch
Paintings in the collection of the Munch Museum
Christmas art
Books in art